Peter Paul Everwine (February 14, 1930 – October 28, 2018) was an American poet.

Life
Born on February 14, 1930, in Detroit, Michigan, Everwine grew up in western Pennsylvania, and was educated in the Midwest. In 1962, he joined Philip Levine, on the faculty of Fresno State University. He retired from there in 1992.

He was a senior Fulbright lecturer in American poetry at the University of Haifa, Israel. In 2008, he was visiting writer at Reed College.

Everwine is the author of seven collections of poetry. His poetry has appeared in The Paris Review, Antaeus, and American Poetry Review.

He lived in Fresno, California, where he died on October 28, 2018, aged 88.

Awards
 Collecting the Animals, which won the 1972 Lamont Poetry Prize.
 Stegner Fellow Stanford
 Horizon Awards 2008
 Best American Poetry 2008
 Pushcart Prize XVII
 Fellowships from The National Endowment for the Arts
 Guggenheim Fellowship 1975

Work

Poetry books
 
 
 
 
 
 
 Pulling the Invisible but Heavy Cart; Last Poems. Stephen F. Austin State University Press at Nacagdoches, Texas. 2019. .

Translation
 
 Working the Song Fields, Spring 2009. (A collection of his Aztec translations)
 
  (His first book of Aztec translations )

Anthology

Ploughshares

References

External links
 "Great Books from Great Poets", The Olives of Oblivion , June 09, 2008
 "Peter Everwine's from the meadow", July 05, 2007, THE GREAT AMERICAN PINUP
 "Editors Book Pick", Independent Reviews, June/July 2002
 

California State University, Fresno faculty
Writers from Fresno, California
2018 deaths
1930 births